Aperture Tag: The Paint Gun Testing Initiative is a 2014 puzzle-platform game developed by the Aperture Tag Team. Originally made as a mod of Valve's Portal series, it was released on July 15, 2014. The game removes the iconic portal gun of the series and instead utilizes a newly created paint gun that fires two kinds of gel with different properties. The game features new characters and voice acting, along with a co-op mode that includes a level editor.

Gameplay 
The primary tool used in the game is the paint gun which fires two kinds of gel, blue and orange. Both gels were featured in Portal 2, with the blue providing a jump boost and bouncing pad and the orange gel providing a speed boost. Unlike the stationary locations of gel in Portal 2, however, the paint gun allows the player to apply the gels to paint-enabled surfaces through the levels.

The game also takes advantage of a cut part of the Portal series in Pneumatic Diversity vents/tubes, which were featured in early trailers for Portal 2. They are used in Aperture Tag to move the player from level to level in order to make the transitions faster.

Development 
Eugenio Roman, the original organizer of the Aperture Tag Team, first began considering paint gun and gel concepts before the Portal 2 game was released and when the gel components of the game were announced. It was stated that the concept of paint for Portal 2 was first derived from the game Tag: The Power of Paint, whose team was hired to work on the paint aspects of Portal 2. After playing this precursor, Roman wanted to do more with the aspects of the game, especially the paint gun. The paint gun he ended up using for Aperture Tag was developed by another modder in the community. Roman asked the creator if he could use the device, was approved to do so, and made some modifications before releasing his own map utilizing it.

After attending a Valve-hosted closed beta for the Perpetual Testing Initiative, Roman asked the employees if a paint gun add-on was going to be developed for Portal 2 so that it could be used in community made maps. They responded that while a weapon_paintgun file was in the game, it didn't do anything and had been dropped from the release entirely. Roman paid a visit to Valve in May 2013 and decided afterward to make Aperture Tag a full modification release and not just a series of episodic maps.

The game's soundtrack was composed by Harry101UK, and Christopher McEvoy, and also included the song "All These Walls" by Abarax. Many of the tracks are remixes of tracks in the soundtrack of Portal 2.

Reception 
ValveTime stated "[Aperture Tag] looks great, it plays well, and it last 2–3 hours. Giving it good value for money." ValveTime praised the visual and level design for its gameplay mechanic and variety, level design structure, polish degree, soundtrack detail consistency and map scale without affecting performance. However, they also criticized the pacing of the story and dialog falling weak many times.

PC Gamer rated the game 58 points out of 100, stating that it "lacks balance and grows repetitive, but provides a handful of good puzzle chambers if you're willing to pay for them."

A general statement by purchasers of the game in reviews on Steam have been that it has a "poorly written script, sub-par voice acting, and general lack of polish". Others, however, have largely complained about the existence at all of a $7 price tag for a licensed mod, rather than the game being free of charge.

References 

2014 video games
Abandoned buildings and structures in fiction
Cooperative video games
First-person shooters
Laboratories in fiction
Linux games
MacOS games
Portal (series)
Puzzle-platform games
Science fiction video games
Source (game engine) mods
Video games developed in the United States
Video games featuring female protagonists
Video games set in the United States
Video games with Steam Workshop support
Windows games